I Hope may refer to:

 "I Hope" (Dixie Chicks song)
 "I Hope" (Gabby Barrett song)
 "I Hope" (Rebecca Ferguson song)